Porites is a genus of stony coral; they are small polyp stony (SPS) corals. They are characterised by a finger-like morphology. Members of this genus have widely spaced calices, a well-developed wall reticulum and are bilaterally symmetrical. Porites, particularly Porites lutea, often form microatolls. Corals of the genus Porites also often serve as hosts for Christmas tree worms (Spirobranchus giganteus).

Aquarium trade
Specimens of Porites are sometimes available for purchase in the aquarium trade. Due to the  strict water quality, lighting and dietary requirements, keeping Porites in captivity is very difficult.

Paleoclimatology
Porites corals have been shown to be accurate and precise recorders of past marine surface conditions. Measurements of the oxygen isotopic composition of the aragonitic skeleton of coral specimens indicate the sea-surface temperature conditions and the oxygen isotopic composition of the seawater at the time of growth. The oxygen isotopic composition of seawater can indicate the precipitation/evaporation balance because oxygen atoms of the more abundant mass 16 will preferentially evaporate before the more rare mass 18 oxygen. The relationship between temperature, precipitation, and the oxygen isotopic composition of Porites corals is important for reconstructing past climates, and associated large-scale patterns such as the El-Nino Southern Oscillation, the Intertropical Convergence Zone, and the mean state of the climate system.

Ecology and biogeography
Corals in the genus Porites are found in reefs throughout the world. It is a dominant taxon on the Pandora platform of the Great Barrier Reef. Potts et al. (1985) identified 7 dominant species: P. lobata, P. solida, P. lutea, P. australiensis, P. mayeri, P. murrayensis, and P. anae. The oldest of six colonies in this reef was approximately 700 years old, and was estimated to be growing at 10.3 mm per year.

Meyer and Schultz (1985) demonstrated that P. furcata has a mutualistic relationship with the schools of French and white grunts (Haemulon flavolineatum and H. plumierii) that rest in their heads during the day. The fish provide it with ammonium, nitrates, and phosphorus compounds. Coral heads with resting grunts experience significantly higher growth rates and nitrogen composition than those without.

Representatives of this genus are found in both the Indo-Pacific and Caribbean basins.

Physiology
Some species in this genus demonstrate high levels of halotolerance. In the Gulf of Thailand P. lutea tolerates daily tidal shifts of 10-30‰ salinity. Moberg et al. (1997) determined that when the salinity declines, the symbiotic zooxanthellae decrease their photosynthesis rate as the coral contracts its polyps to protect them. The corals maintain their metabolic rate by temporarily switching to heterotrophy, consuming prey such as brine shrimp and other zooplankton.

Porites growth rates can be determined by examining annual rings in their skeleton. This method was used to determine that P. astreoides grows its skeleton about the central axis by approximately 3.67mm/year, calcifies at approximately 0.55g/cm²/year, and increases density in this region of the body at approximately 1.69g/cm³/year. Additionally, Meyer and Schultz (1985) reported that coral growth varies seasonally. They observed that P. furcata's growth rate peaked between May and August, which is summertime in their Caribbean habitat.

Threats
Threats to corals in the genus Porites include predation, climate change, and anthropogenic pollution. When exposed to increased temperatures and copper, P. cylindrica slowed its rate of production. Additionally, the symbiotic zooxanthellae reduced their photosynthesis rate when exposed to both stressors.

Done and Potts (1992) observed that when settled, larvae in Porites are vulnerable to competition from other corals and predation from sea urchins. Additionally, mortality likelihood increases following strong storms.

Species

 
 Porites alveolata Milne Edwards, 1860
 †Porites amplectans Felix, 1921
 Porites annae Crossland, 1952
 †Porites anguillensis Vaughan, 1919
 Porites aranetai Nemenzo, 1955
 Porites arnaudi Reyes-Bonilla & Carricart-Ganivet, 2000
 Porites astreoides Lamarck, 1816
 Porites attenuata Nemenzo, 1955
 Porites australiensis Vaughan, 1918
 Porites baueri Squires, 1959
 Porites branneri Rathbun, 1887
 Porites brighami Vaughan, 1907
 Porites cocosensis Wells, 1950
 Porites colonensis Zlatarski, 1990
 Porites columnaris Klunzinger, 1879
 Porites compressa Dana, 1846
 Porites cribripora Dana, 1846
 Porites cumulatus Nemenzo, 1955
 Porites cylindrica Dana, 1846
 Porites decasepta Clareboudt, 2006
 Porites deformis Nemenzo, 1955
 Porites densa Vaughan, 1918
 Porites desilveri Veron, 2000
 Porites divaricata LeSueur, 1821
 Porites echinulata Klunzinger, 1879
 Porites eridani Umbgrove, 1940
 Porites evermanni Vaughan, 1907
 Porites exserta Pillai, 1967
 Porites flavus Veron, 2000
 Porites fontanesii Benzoni & Stefani, 2012
 Porites fragosa Dana, 1846
 Porites furcata Lamarck, 1816
 Porites gaimardi Milne Edwards & Haime, 1851
 Porites harrisoni Veron, 2000
 Porites hawaiiensis Vaughan, 1907
 Porites heronensis Veron, 1985
 Porites horizontalata Hoffmeister, 1925
 †Porites indica Duncan, 1880 
 Porites latistellata Quelch, 1886

 Porites lichen Dana, 1846
 Porites lobata Dana, 1846
 Porites lutea Quoy & Gaimard, 1833
 †Porites macdonaldi Vaughan, 1919
 Porites mannarensis Pillai, 1967
 Porites mayeri Vaughan, 1918
 Porites minicoiensis Pillai, 1967
 Porites monticulosa Dana, 1846
 Porites murrayensis Vaughan, 1918
 Porites myrmidonensis Veron, 1985
 Porites napopora Veron, 2000
 Porites negrosensis Veron, 1990
 Porites nigrescens Dana, 1846
 Porites nodifera Klunzinger, 1879
 Porites okinawensis Veron, 1990
 Porites ornata Nemenzo, 1971
 Porites palmata Dana, 1846
 Porites panamensis Verrill, 1866
 †Porites pellegrinii Duncan, 1880 
 Porites porites Pallas, 1766
 †Porites portoricensis Vaughan, 1919
 Porites profundus Rehberg, 1892
 Porites pukoensis Vaughan, 1907
 Porites randalli Forsman & Birkeland, 2009
 †Porites reussiana Ducan & Wall, 1865
 Porites rugosa Fenner & Veron, 2000
 Porites rus Forskål, 1775
 Porites sillimaniani Nemenzo, 1976
 Porites solida Forskål, 1775
 Porites somaliensis Gravier, 1910
 Porites stephensoni Crossland, 1952
 Porites superfusa Gardiner, 1898
 †Porites superposita Duncan, 1880 
 Porites sverdrupi Durham, 1947
 †Porites trinitatis Vaughan in Vaughan and Hoffmeister, 1926
 Porites tuberculosa Veron, 2000
 Porites vaughani Crossland, 1952
 †Porites waylandi Foster, 1986

References

Poritidae
Cnidarian genera
Taxa named by Johann Heinrich Friedrich Link